Earth-Two (also Earth Two or Earth 2) is a setting for stories (a "fictional universe") appearing in American comic books published by DC Comics. First appearing in The Flash #123 (1961), Earth-Two was created to explain differences between the original Golden Age and then-current Silver Age versions of characters such as the Flash, and how the current (Earth-One) versions could appear in stories alongside earlier versions of the same character concepts. Earth-Two includes DC Golden Age heroes, including the Justice Society of America, whose careers began at the dawn of World War II, concurrently with their first appearances in comics. Earth-Two, along with the four other surviving Earths of the DC Multiverse, were merged into one in the 1985 miniseries Crisis on Infinite Earths. However, following the events of Infinite Crisis, the Multiverse was reborn, although the subsequent Earth-Two was not the same as its pre-Crisis equivalent.

Following the events of Flashpoint, the setting was revised once again, and was now identified as "Earth 2" (instead of "Earth Two" or "Earth-Two"). While it still houses a team of superheroes, its membership is younger than before. Earth 2 also has a tragic backstory, having been invaded by an alien horde from Apokolips five years prior to the reboot, ahead of Darkseid's attempted invasion of Prime Earth. In the process, this reality's Superman, Batman and Wonder Woman all died, while its Supergirl and Robin were swept through a dimensional warp to Prime Earth where they became known as Power Girl and Huntress.

Publication history

Introduction ("Flash of Two Worlds")

Characters from DC Comics were originally suggestive of each existing in their own world, as superheroes never encountered each other. This was soon changed with alliances being formed between certain protagonists. Several publications, including All Star Comics (publishing tales of the Justice Society of America), Leading Comics (publishing tales of the Seven Soldiers of Victory) and other comic books introduced a "shared universe" among several characters during the 1940s. By the 1950s, as the popularity of superheroes was waning, comics shifted to horror, westerns and war. Batman, Superman and Wonder Woman were among the few DC continued to publish.

Beginning in the early 1960s, the popularity of superheroes began to grow. DC introduced more modern versions of its heroes. For example, Hawkman was an alien policeman instead of a reincarnated Egyptian prince. Older versions of DC characters were assigned to an "alternative reality" Earth that existed within its own fictional "universe" and could communicate with the Earth of the current, revised versions of those characters.

Alternative-reality Earths had been used in DC stories before, but were usually not referred to after that particular story.  Most of these alternative Earths were usually so vastly different that no one would confuse that Earth and its history with the so-called real Earth. That would change when the existence of another reliable Earth was established in a story titled "Flash of Two Worlds" in which Barry Allen, the modern Flash later referred to as the Flash of Earth-One (the setting of the Silver Age stories) first travels to another Earth, accidentally vibrating at just the right speed to appear on Earth-Two, where he meets Jay Garrick, his Earth-Two counterpart. He claims Gardner Fox's dreams were tuned into Earth-Two, explaining their depiction as a fictional world in earlier Barry Allen stories.

Expanding the concept: revisiting 1940s superheroes
Superman was introduced in the 1930s and was the archetype for the modern superhero, and so is depicted in stories set on Earth-Two as the first major reliable costumed superhero on that world, discounting earlier part-time heroes and "mystery men" such as Doctor Occult. Most of the following costumed mystery men history is based on the Earth-Two Superman's initial appearance, where these previously independent operating heroes begin to reliably interact. In order to distinguish him from the later primary version of the character, this Superman was called "Kal-L", using the spelling of Superman's Kryptonian name in his early appearances. He was specifically introduced as an Earth-Two character in Justice League of America #73 (1969). Most superheroes from the Golden Age later followed this trend of operating publicly, while wearing distinctive costuming and interacting in a largely shared universe. The primary characters of Superman and Batman still largely worked independent of team environments.

In the 1970s, as the now annual team up between the Justice League of America and the Justice Society of America had proven popular, DC published the then present day adventures of the Justice Society in the revived All-Star Comics with issue #58, resuming the numbering from the series' original run. The story continued in Adventure Comics #461–466, which featured the death of the Earth-Two Batman in issue #462. Mr and Mrs Superman, a feature in Superman Family (1974–1982), featured stories of the adventures of married Superman and Lois Lane of Earth-Two. These stories were set at a time in which the Superman of Earth-Two was at a similar age to the then-present-day Superman of Earth-One. In the 1980s DC published All-Star Squadron, which covered the war time history of various superheroes during World War II.

Infinity, Inc., a group made up of the children and heirs of the Justice Society, was introduced in All-Star Squadron #25 (September 1983). There was an eponymous comics series starring the group, which ran from March 1984 through June 1988.

Abandonment: Crisis on Infinite Earths
Crisis on Infinite Earths (1985–1986) was an effort by DC Comics to clean up their continuity, resulting in the multiple universes combining into one. Since then, a handful of characters originating from Earth-Two have consistently remained part of the merged Earth, including Power Girl, Jay Garrick, and Alan Scott. Superman and Lois Lane from Earth-Two (along with Superboy from Earth Prime, and Alexander Luthor Jr. from Earth-Three) were transported into a ghost-like "paradise dimension" tangential to the new universe.

Following the end of the known Multiverse, more alternate realities were discovered. Even though Earth-Three was destroyed in the Anti-Monitor's anti-matter wave attacks, a new Crime Syndicate (called the "Crime Syndicate of Amerika") developed in the antimatter universe of Qward, which was very different in background and power base from the pre-Crisis Earth-Three group, though same in the number of members. After the Kingdom event, Hypertime and divergent realities were revealed, but never supposed to be accessed, as stated in the Zero Hour event. They were later revealed when a directly-parallel Flash (Walter West aka the "Dark Flash") entered the mainstream DC Universe and threatened to destroy it. These alternate realities are usually addressed as "Elsewhere" and "Elseworld" stories.

Reviving the Multiverse: Infinite Crisis
Kal-L, Lois Lane-Kent, Superboy-Prime, and Alexander Luthor Jr. returned during Infinite Crisis. Unknown to Kal-L, Luthor's plan was to resurrect the pre-Crisis Multiverse. He wanted to mix and match elements from each reality to create a "perfect world". The fallout of the conflict brought the short-lived return of an Earth-Two copy and the deaths of Kal-L, Lois Lane-Kent and Luthor Jr. of Earth-Two. It is unclear what happened to the aged Diana Trevor, the Earth-Two Wonder Woman, though she faded from her ghostly existence. Inexplicably, Earth-Two was the only returning world that was devoid of most people, except the Justice Society, Kal-L, and his wife Lois Kent. This world was a copy, new and recently manufactured by Alexander Luthor Jr. of pre-Crisis Earth-Three, instead of resurrected. This copy Earth-Two was recombined with the primary Earth to form the primary DC reality termed as "New Earth".

Post-52 version
At the end of the Infinite Crisis limited series, the realigned world is called "New Earth". In the final issue of the 52 weekly series, it is revealed that fifty-two duplicate worlds have been created and all but New Earth have been altered from the original incarnation. The post-Crisis Earth-2 made its first appearance in a single panel of 52 Week 52 where it resembled the pre-Crisis Earth-Two, where a newspaper article says that this world's Superman and Power Girl are missing. The Flashes of New Earth (Jay Garrick and Wally West) briefly glimpsed this world with Robin and Huntress in action (during their travel with the Cosmic Treadmill as shown in Justice Society (vol. 3) #11) and Monarch selected Jay Garrick of this Earth (amongst others) in a Multiversal arena tournament. Based on comments by 52 co-writer Grant Morrison, this alternate universe is not the pre-Crisis Earth-Two.

This separation between the pre-Crisis Earth-Two and post-Crisis Earth-2 is formally established in Justice Society of America (vol. 3) Annual #1 (2008), with a story titled "Earth 2 Chapter One: Golden Age", in which the New Earth Power Girl arrives on post-Crisis Earth-2. Thinking that she has returned home to her long destroyed pre-Crisis Earth-Two. Power Girl crash lands and unconscious, on the closest parallel of the 52 Multiverse, the post-Crisis Earth-2, which appears similar to the pre-Crisis Earth-Two. She is found by the post-Crisis Earth-2 Huntress, who thinks she is her long-missing best friend, the Power Girl native to this world. In this new reality, the Justice Society of America has merged with Infinity, Inc. and is now known as Justice Society Infinity. Initially, Power Girl believes she has returned home, until the missing post-Crisis Earth-2 Power Girl reappears and declares that the other Power Girl is an impostor, and has caused the disappearance of the post-Crisis Earth-2 Superman. This turn of events results in the post-Crisis Earth-2 Power Girl and the Justice Society Infinity to go after the New Earth Power Girl.

The Power Girl of New Earth recruits the post-Crisis Earth-2 Michael Holt, who is a physics professor and father and has never become a costumed hero, to help her return to her source Earth. Holt constructs a device similar to the Cosmic treadmill used by Barry Allen to open a portal to New Earth. The Power Girl of New Earth returns home, followed by the Justice Society Infinity, who kidnap her and take her back to post-Crisis Earth-2. During the confrontation, Green Lantern and Jade are initially confused when they see each other, as the post-Crisis Earth-2 Jade's father, Alan Scott, is dead, and New Earth's Jade is dead as well. The JSI interrogate Power Girl for information on the post-Crisis Earth-2 Superman's whereabouts. The post-Crisis Earth-2 Power Girl assumes that the Superman the New Earth Power Girl said was dead was the post-Crisis Earth-2 Superman (rather than Kal-L who was killed by Superboy-Prime) and that the New Earth Power Girl had killed him. The Justice Society of New Earth arrives to stop her torture. Starman reveals that the re-creation of the Multiverse led to the creation of a Power Girl and Superman native to this new universe, post-Crisis Earth-2 and that the post-Crisis Earth-2 Superman is still alive. The Power Girl of New Earth then returns home along with her Justice Society but with no apology from her counterpart nor from the post-Crisis Earth-2 Huntress for their actions against her.

Earth 2 in "The New 52"

In September 2011, The New 52 rebooted DC's continuity. In this new timeline, the Earth-2 concept has been revived and is covered in two series; Worlds' Finest, which focuses on the adventures of the Huntress and Power Girl on New Earth written by Paul Levitz, and Earth 2, originally written by James Robinson and then by Tom Taylor, which features the formation of the Justice Society. James Robinson, the original writer of Earth 2, describes the new Earth 2 as a complete reboot of the concept, with superheroes only just now appearing, similar to the "young hero" concept for the New 52 continuity, and with revamped costume designs.

In Earth 2, Superman, Batman, Wonder Woman, and Catwoman seemingly gave their lives in order to repel the Apokoliptan invasion, leaving behind a world with no heroes. Supergirl and Robin (Helena Wayne) end up stranded in the mainstream universe towards the end of the invasion. When the Earth-2 Solomon Grundy threatens the world, three new heroes team up to defeat him: the Flash (Jay Garrick), Hawkgirl (Kendra Saunders), and Green Lantern (Alan Scott). In later issues, Mister Terrific (Michael Holt) from the mainstream universe joins the team. Other heroes who have made appearances include Dr. Fate (Khalid Ben-Hassin), the Atom (Al Pratt, now nuclear-powered), the Sandman (Wesley Dodds), Mister Miracle, and Big Barda. In addition, the heroes of the Earth get supported by the World Army. Villains include Solomon Grundy, a now-villainous Terry Sloan, Wotan, Steppenwolf and what was thought to be a surviving, Darkseid-brainwashed Superman, which turned out to be a very powerful but genetically unstable Bizarro-type clone. Writer James Robinson left the series with issue #16 and Tom Taylor became the new writer at #17. Other new characters introduced as the series progresses include a female Red Tornado (an android with the consciousness of Lois Lane that was uploaded into it by Sam Lane and Robotman), a hyper-intelligent knowledge-assimilator known as Accountable (Jimmy Olsen), a new Batman (Thomas Wayne using Miraclo), a new version of Aquawoman (Marella), and a new Superman (Val-Zod, a Kryptonian and a childhood friend of Power Girl's who had been imprisoned by Terry Sloan).

Towards the end of the series, Darkseid launches a second invasion of Earth, which is depicted in both Earth 2 and the weekly series Earth 2: World's End. Another weekly series, The New 52: Futures End, depicts a possible future in which refugees from a destroyed Earth 2 come to Earth 0 and prompt society to fracture. Over the course of the series, several new characters are introduced, such as Yolanda Montez, an Avatar of the Red who is a counterpart of Alan Scott; a second Red Arrow, an Earth 2 equivalent of Oliver Queen; Ted Grant, a former boxer; and Dick Grayson, a journalist who goes on a mission to find his son after his wife Barbara Gordon is killed during the invasion. Others change alignment; Wonder Woman and Steppenwolf's daughter Fury sides with Mister Miracle and the other heroes after Big Barda reveals her loyalty to Darkseid. Huntress and Power Girl return to Earth 2 as well to take part in a mad scramble to save the Earth and then later, to save its people along with a computerized record of human culture and life on Earth created by Bruce Wayne. In Earth 2: World's End #11, it is revealed that Highfather made a deal with Darkseid that he would not interfere with Darkseid's plans for conquest so long as Darkseid only preyed upon one Earth of the Multiverse, which was Earth 2, explaining the recurrent tragedies faced by this world in comparison to others. In the end, Darkseid is successful, and the Earth is destroyed, and attempts to take Earth 2's refugees to Earth 0 are prevented by a time traveling Tim Drake in Futures End. Just as the world ends, several of the Wonders are sent to the planet Telos by Brainiac, where they confront their counterparts from various parallel worlds, both present and extinct, in the Convergence miniseries. Over the course of the series, Batman dies and Dick Grayson, inspired by his Batman counterparts from other worlds, takes up the mantle from Thomas Wayne. Ultimately, the planet Telos is terraformed into a new Earth-like planet and sent to the Earth 2 dimension as a new home for its refugees.

The heroes' fraught attempts at forming a new society, rapidly augmented by Terry Sloan's technology, is depicted in the follow-on series Earth 2: Society (August 2015 – March 2017). It also debuts versions of Hourman and Mist. The final arc of the series recreates Earth 2 again making it appear similar to their universe's first Earth through use of an Amazon artifact known as Pandora's Casket by Ultra-Humanite. This Earth has had no history of Wonders with Ultra-Humanite controlling the world behind the scenes. Following Ultra-Humanite's defeat, the Wonders becomes the world's new defenders and hopes that this Earth is the Earth they can protect.

At the end of Doomsday Clock #12 (2019), Doctor Manhattan reverses the actions that created the "New 52" universe, restoring Alan Scott and the Justice Society's original full histories as before Flashpoint, and the original Earth-Two is explained as existing in the multiverse too.

Characters

A number of characters, heroes and villains, had counterparts on both Earth-One and Two. Generally speaking, the older Earth-Two versions were phased out or incorporated into their younger, Earth-One versions following Crisis on Infinite Earths. Several others were rebooted almost entirely, with their new versions having nothing in common with the old ones. For instance, Jim Corrigan of Earth-Two was a murdered police detective who served as the human host for the Spectre, while his Earth-One counterpart was a Metropolis police officer who often assisted Daily Planet cub reporter Jimmy Olsen and superhero Black Lightning. Many characters would often travel from one Earth to the other and interact with its natives or even immigrate. For example, Larry Jordan, the first Air Wave and native of Earth-Two, traveled to Earth-One under yet-unexplained circumstances, married Helen (the second Air Wave) and raised a son, Hal (the third Air Wave).

Unique features
The history of Earth-Two is slightly different from both real world history and the history of other versions of Earth from DC Comics stories. For example in classic Earth-Two stories, by the 1970s, Quebec is shown to be an independent nation autonomous from Canada. South Africa abolished apartheid sooner than in the real world. The fictional countries of Dukalia, Luxor, Napkan, Nastonia, Oxnalia, Thornia and others existed on the Axis side in WW2 (though most of these disappeared when the US entered the war). Unlike other DC Comics depictions of Atlantis, the Atlantean countries of Poseidonis and Tritonis were ruled by a queen, not a king (along with its inhabitants displaying surface dweller features and no capacity for underwater survival, as the Atlantis continent had been raised).

In addition, masked crimefighters are introduced decades earlier than in other universes later identified within DC Comics, and these participated in such historic conflicts as World War II. Franklin Delano Roosevelt founded both the Justice Society of America and the All-Star Squadron. Other events taking place decades earlier include the destruction of Krypton and the advent of advanced technology such as interstellar transportation and time travel.

Thousands of years ago, the Guardians of Earth-One's Universe expelled the vast majority of magic from their universe, sending it to Earth-Two. This resulted in a predominance of magic and a weakening of scientific laws within Earth-Two's universe.

Variants
Because Earth-Two as presented did not match up with the actual comics of DC's Golden Age, other alternative Earths were used to explain the discrepancies.

Earth-Two-A (also known as Alternate Earth-Two) was where Clark Kent worked for the Daily Planet under editor Parry White in the 1940s and 1950s (on regular Earth-Two Kent worked for the Daily Star, his editor was George Taylor, and Perry White was a reporter).

Earth-Two-B (also Earth-Forty-Six) is a world referenced but not described in the Crisis on Infinite Earths: Absolute Edition.

Earth-E (Earth-216) is the world where the Super-Sons adventures happened and was used to explain 1950s Batman and Superman stories that didn't fit with either Earth-One or Earth-Two history. Mark Gruenwald assigned it to the 1951–1960 period of those books.

In other media

Television
 A variation of Earth-2 appears in the 
Lois & Clark: The New Adventures of Superman live-action series episode "Tempus Anyone?" Time-traveling author H.G. Wells takes Earth-1 Lois Lane to a parallel universe version of Metropolis that has Clark Kent, but no Superman. While inspiring this alternate Kent to become the Superman of his world, Lane discovers her counterpart had died years earlier and also encounters James Olsen, owner of the Daily Planet; mayoral candidate Perry White; and Kent's fiancé Lana Lang, who kept him from using his powers. While Earth-2 Kent became Superman, he sacrificed his civilian identity in the process. In the episode "Lois and Clarks", Earth-2 Kent came to Earth-1 following an encounter with the time-traveling sociopath Tempus, who trapped Earth-1 Superman in a time loop.
 A variation of Earth-2 appears in the Smallville series live-action series. Resembling the Post-Crisis Earth-3, this version of Earth-1 is a dark mirror-universe where Clark Kent was found and raised by Lionel Luthor instead of Jonathan and Martha Kent and helped him take control of the world by turning him into Ultraman. The only known way to access this universe was through the Kryptonian Mirror box, but Lionel escaped to Earth-1 to assume his dead counterpart's position in Luthorcorp while Clark destroyed the box.
 A variation of Earth-2 appears in live-action media set in the Arrowverse:
 Earth-2 first appears in season two of The Flash. While possessing some similarities to Earth-1, the architecture, fashion, and entertainment outlets resembled mixtures of contemporary 21st century and 1940s styles. Furthermore, certain areas of science and technology were far more advanced than on Earth-1 and the inhabitants of Earth-2 appear as opposites in regards to personality and circumstances compared to their Earth-1 doppelgängers. Earth-1 and Earth-2 were originally connected by a wormhole after Eobard Thawne was erased in season one finale. After the singularity collapsed, the explosion opened 52 breaches throughout Central City that allowed passage between the two worlds, though only by speedsters or through technological means. This universe was the home of Harry and Jessie Wells, the evil speedster Zoom, and Black Siren (Laurel Lance's doppleganger).
 Earth-2 also appears in the Arrow episode "Starling City". Oliver Queen visits Earth-2 to retrieve Dwarf Star particles for the Monitor. He succeeds before Earth-2 is destroyed by an anti-matter wave sent by the Anti-Monitor, though Black Siren managed to escape with him.
 Following the multiverse's destruction and rebirth during the events of "Crisis on Infinite Earths", a new Earth-2 was created in place of the original in which the live-action series Stargirl takes place.

Film

 A variation of Earth-Two appears in Justice Society: World War II after the Flash time travels to WWII-era Germany meeting the newly-formed Justice Society.
 Walter Hamada confirmed in August 2020 during DC FanDome that DC Films were establishing a new film continuity tentatively named "Earth-2" that would co-exist adjunct from the DC Extended Universe (dubbed as "Earth-1") and their more experimental standalone DC Comics-based projects such as the 2019 film Joker. This version of Earth-2 serves as the setting for the Matt Reeves film The Batman (2022), and will then be expanded upon by several television series currently in development, including a series centered on the Gotham City Police Department, and a show centered on the film's version of Penguin portrayed by Colin Farrell.

Video games
 An Earth 2 skin pack was released as Downloadable content for Injustice: Gods Among Us, which included alternate skins for the Flash, Hawkgirl, and Solomon Grundy based on the appearances of Jay Garrick, Kendra Saunders, and New 52 Grundy.
 A pre-order skin pack for Batman: Arkham Origins includes two Earth-2 skins for Batman, one based on Earth-2 Batman's New 52 appearance and the other depicting the Flashpoint Batman.

References

External links
 

Earth 2 at Mike's Amazing World of Comics

 
1961 in comics
Fictional elements introduced in 1961
DC Comics dimensions
DC Comics planets
Fiction about Earth